Graphic Arts Technical Foundation is a nonprofit, scientific, technical, and educational organization which promotes the technological advancement of the printing industry worldwide. 

The Foundation fulfills its missions through its five divisions: research, training, consulting, quality controls, and publications. 

Its headquarters in Sewickley, Pennsylvania, a suburb of Pittsburgh, includes state-of-the-art prepress, pressrooms, testing laboratories, libraries, and classrooms that provide a platform for sheetfed and web printing research. GATF's research activities include waste control, environmental studies, press and prepress research, and quality control. Educational activities include a large graphic arts library, a publication program, career and curricular consultation for schools and universities, and seminars, workshops, and conferences for the graphic arts community.

In 1999 GATF consolidated with the Printing Industries of America becoming Printing Industries of America/Graphic Arts Technical Foundation (PIA/GATF) using a logo that was a combination of the two independent organizations logos. In 2009 after an extensive re-branding initiative, the association changed its name to Printing Industries of America and unveiled a new logo. The Graphic Arts Technical Foundation has subsequently become a division of Printing Industries of America known as the Center for Technology and Research.

GATF was established in 1924 as the Lithographic Technical Foundation when lithography was a relatively new commercial printing process. It was headquartered in New York City and Chicago for many years until the 1960s, when it was renamed GATF and moved near to Carnegie Mellon University, with whom it often partnered.

References

External links
Printing Industries of America homepage

Arts and media trade groups
Allegheny County, Pennsylvania
Organizations based in Pittsburgh
Non-profit organizations based in Pennsylvania